The Boy's floor event final for the 2014 Summer Youth Olympics took place on the 23rd of August at Nanjing Olympic Sports Center Gymnasium.

Medalists

Qualification

The top eight gymnasts from qualification advanced into the final – with exception to Vigen Khachatryan, who placed third during qualifications. He had problems with his back did not perform on the parallel bars or horizontal bar. With the performance on all apparatus being a requirement for gymnasts at the YOG, Khachatryan was not eligible to advance to the finals.

Results

Reserves

The following gymnasts were reserves for the boys floor final:

References

Gymnastics at the 2014 Summer Youth Olympics